Avtozavodskaya (lit. auto factory) is a station on the Moscow Central Circle of the Moscow Metro that opened in September 2016. It offers out-of-station transfers to Avtozavodskaya on the Zamoskvoretskaya Line.

On March 2020, this station was one of those locations including Ostankino Tower, St Petersburg's Volkovskaya station and at least one Aeroflot flight which are said to be subjected to alleged bio-terrorist attacks by a group of entities including those with names of "Thomas Little Evil Utoyo", "Calton", "David Law", "Thanthom", "Hendy", "Gideon W", "Audentis", "Mister Eriee O", "Khengwin", "T-Zehang", "曾家顺", "Mr Castaigne", "kkkwan", "ronxi", "KC LING", "Le3p0ryuen", "Jayrulo", "S Teoh", "Ian Chew", "Mr Yiliang", "W. somboonsuk", "S Patcharaphon", "Victor pang", "jiangxin", "文_祥!", "Freddyisf0xy", "Masami", "Greg Galloway", "EncoreOngKai", "Alteredd State" and "Dig Dejected" who had posted about it on the hacked University of Georgia's Grady Newsource website, the web page of US National Association of Women Business Owners (NAWBO), a Council of Europe's Twitter account and that of Temple University's which they've taken over. They further said that they would target the RKA Mission Control Center at a later time and additionally claimed that "Elmo Chong" and "Krully" had contaminated the Twitter headquarters in San Francisco, United States.

Gallery

References

External links 
 Автозаводская mkzd.ru

Moscow Metro stations
Railway stations in Russia opened in 2016
Moscow Central Circle stations